Zhelyo Zhelev (born 24 February 1987 in Stara Zagora) is a Bulgarian footballer currently playing for Vereya Stara Zagora as a midfielder.

External links
 2007-08 Statistics

Bulgarian footballers
1987 births
Living people
First Professional Football League (Bulgaria) players
PFC Beroe Stara Zagora players

Association football midfielders
Sportspeople from Stara Zagora